The Iranian Basketball Super League (IBSL) is a professional men's basketball league in Iran. It was founded in 1998. The current champions is Shahrdari Gorgan. The league follows the promotion and relegation system in which the worst two teams are relegated to 1st Division.

Current clubs 
Aftab Zagros Ahvaz
Avijeh Sanat Parsa Mashhad
Ayandehsazan Tehran
Chemidor Qom
Exxon Tehran
Koochin Amol
Mahram Tehran
Niroo Zamini Tehran
Palayesh Naft Abadan
Raad Padafand Mashhad
Sanat Mes Kerman
Sanat Mes Rafsanjan
Shahrdari Bandar Abbas
Shahrdari Gorgan
Shora & Shahrdari Qazvin
Zob Ahan Isfahan
Sanaye Hormozgan

League champions

Division One

Super League

Titles by club

Titles by city

Notable foreign players

External links
I.R. Iran Basketball Federation
Super League page on Asia-Basket

 
League
Basketball
Basketball leagues in Asia
Sports leagues established in 1998
1998 establishments in Iran
Professional sports leagues in Iran